"Losing a Friend" is a Nylon single. It reached number one in Iceland. Written by Tony & Chris Griffiths of the real people

Track listings

Losing a Friend - 3.38
Give Me One Night - 4.11

Videos
 Youtube

External links
 Nylon Official Site (The site is currently unavailable, possibly canceled.)

2006 singles
Nylon (band) songs
2006 songs
Number-one singles in Iceland